is the terminal railway station operated by Yokohama Minatomirai Railway's Kodomonokuni Line located in the Aoba-ku, Yokohama, Kanagawa Prefecture, Japan. It is located next to the Kodomonokuni Theme Park.

History 
Kodomonokuni Station was opened on April 18, 1967.

Lines 
Yokohama Minatomirai Railway
Kodomonokuni Line

Station layout 
Kodomonokuni Station has an elevated side platform serving one track for bi-directional traffic. The station is normally unattended.

Platforms

References
 Harris, Ken and Clarke, Jackie. Jane's World Railways 2008-2009. Jane's Information Group (2008).

External links
 Kodomonokuni Station 

Railway stations in Kanagawa Prefecture
Railway stations in Japan opened in 1967